Lewis Jackson (born August 13, 1962) is the former men's college basketball head coach at Alabama State University.  He took over as head coach in 2005, after Rob Spivery departed to take the head coach's job at Southern University. Jackson resigned from ASU on March 27, 2020 after 15 seasons.

Prior to becoming the head coach at Alabama State, Jackson was an assistant coach for five years on Spivery's staff.

Jackson also played basketball at Alabama State, currently sitting fourth on Alabama State's all-time scoring list, and was named SWAC Player of the Year in his senior year.  Jackson was inducted into both the Alabama State and SWAC Hall of Fames, and his number was retired by both Alabama State and his high school, Wetumpka High School. Jackson played one year of professional basketball in Australia for the Illawarra Hawks. Jackson was the recipient of the 2009 SWAC Coach of the Year award.

Jackson is married to Alabama State Lady Hornets coach Freda Freeman-Jackson and their daughter Bianca currently plays for Florida State.

Head coaching record

References

External links
   Alabama State profile

1962 births
Living people
Alabama State Hornets basketball coaches
Alabama State Hornets basketball players
American expatriate basketball people in Australia
American expatriate basketball people in Canada
American expatriate basketball people in the Philippines
American men's basketball coaches
American men's basketball players
Basketball coaches from Alabama
Basketball players from Alabama
Golden State Warriors draft picks
Jacksonville Jets (CBA) players
Mississippi Jets players
Pensacola Tornados (1985–86) players
People from Wetumpka, Alabama
Toronto Tornados players
Small forwards
Great Taste Coffee Makers players
Philippine Basketball Association imports